Bob Beers may refer to:

 Bob Beers (ice hockey) (born 1967), American hockey player and commentator
 Bob Beers (politician, born 1951), former Nevada Assemblyman
 Bob Beers (politician, born 1959), Las Vegas City Councilman and former Nevada State Legislator
 Bob Beers (folk singer) (1920–1972), American musician and founder of the Beers Family folk group
 Robert O. Beers (1916–2005), Pennsylvania politician